Jérôme de Sadeleer (born 5 June 1988) is a Swiss rally raid racer who currently competes in the UTV category. He competed in the 2022 Dakar Rally in the T4 class. 
He is the older brother of racing driver Hugo de Sadeleer.

Racing record

Complete European Le Mans Series results 
(key) (Races in bold indicate pole position; results in italics indicate fastest lap)

Complete Le Mans Cup results 
(key) (Races in bold indicate pole position; results in italics indicate fastest lap)

Complete Asian Le Mans Series results 
(key) (Races in bold indicate pole position) (Races in italics indicate fastest lap)

References

1988 births
Living people
Sportspeople from Lausanne
Swiss racing drivers
Dakar Rally drivers

EuroInternational drivers
European Le Mans Series drivers
Asian Le Mans Series drivers
Le Mans Cup drivers